Ruggero (de) Cobelli (5 April 1838 – 5 September 1921) was an Italian entomologist who specialised in Orthoptera, Hemiptera and Hymenoptera.
 
Born in Rovereto and the brother of Giovanni Cobelli, Ruggero Cobelli was a physician.  His collection of Hymenoptera, Orthoptera and Cicadidae is in the Museo Civico Rovereto.

References
Cobelli, G. 1932: [Cobelli, R. de] Publ. Soc. Mus. Civ. Rovereto 59 1-26. 
Conci, C. 1975: Repertorio delle biografie e bibliografie degli scrittori e cultori italiani di entomologia. Mem. Soc. Ent. Ital. 48 1969(4) 817-1069 880 
Conci, C. & Poggi, R. 1996: Iconography of Italian Entomologists, with essential biographical data.  Mem. Soc. Ent. Ital. 75 159–382, 418 Fig. 159–382, Portr. 
Poggi, R. & Conci, C. 1996: [Cobelli, R. de] Mem. Soc. Ent. Ital. 75 32

Italian entomologists
Hymenopterists
1838 births
1921 deaths